The Karuwali were an indigenous people of the state of Queensland.

Country
This took in the area about Farrars Creek near Connemara southwards to Beetoota, Haddon Corner, and Morney Plains. Their eastern extension went to the Beal range while the western frontier was around Durrie and Monkira on the Diamantina River.

History of contact
The Karuwali have been cited as an Australian instance of the practice of colonial genocide.

Alternative names
 Karawalla
 Gara-wali
 Kurrawulla
 Karorinje
 Kuriwalu
 Goore

Notes

Citations

Sources

Aboriginal peoples of Queensland